Sonny Baker (born 13 March 2003) is an English cricketer. He made his List A debut on 25 July 2021, for Somerset in the 2021 Royal London One-Day Cup.

Early life
From Torquay in Devon, Baker spent three years at Torquay Boys' Grammar School before switching to King's College, Taunton, where former Somerset and Devon batsman Robert Woodman is the director of cricket. He signed a contract with the Somerset Academy in 2020.

Following the 2021 Royal London One-Day Cup campaign, Baker signed a two-year professional contract with Somerset. On 13 August 2021, Baker was called up to The Hundred to play for the Trent Rockets as a replacement player.

In December 2021, he was named in England's team for the 2022 ICC Under-19 Cricket World Cup in the West Indies. However, in January 2022, Baker was ruled out of England's squad due to a back injury. He made his Twenty20 debut on 22 August 2022, for Southern Brave in the 2022 season of The Hundred.

References

External links
 

2003 births
Living people
English cricketers
Somerset cricketers
People from Torbay (district)
People educated at Torquay Boys' Grammar School
People educated at King's College, Taunton
Southern Brave cricketers